This is a list of audio productions based on the long-running British science fiction television series Doctor Who produced by Big Finish Productions.

Overview
These are the season and episode counts for all seasons and series released , ordered by the date that they were initially released.

Cast
The dramas feature both former actors who portrayed the Doctor and his companions, and new continuing characters as well as elements from other spin-off media. The canonicity of the audio dramas, as with other Doctor Who spin-off media, is unclear. To date, productions have featured the Fourth (Tom Baker), Fifth (Peter Davison), Sixth (Colin Baker), Seventh (Sylvester McCoy), Eighth (Paul McGann), War (Sir John Hurt), Ninth (Christopher Eccleston) and Tenth (David Tennant) Doctors portrayed by their original actors. In April 2022, it was confirmed Jo Martin would reprise her role as the Fugitive Doctor in a series of audio adventures. 

Big Finish's current licence from the BBC allows it to produce audio dramas featuring the first twelve incarnations of the Doctor and associated characters introduced into the series between 1963 and 2017. Although Big Finish confirmed in April 2022 that they are producing stories featuring associated characters introduced during the era of the Thirteenth Doctor (Jodie Whittaker), specifically The Fugitive Doctor (Jo Martin) and The Master (Sacha Dhawan), it is not clear whether this includes the Thirteenth Doctor herself.

Nearly all of the companions from the original series have appeared, voiced by their original actors. They include Susan (Carole Ann Ford), Ian Chesterton (William Russell), Vicki (Maureen O'Brien), Steven Taylor (Peter Purves), Sara Kingdom (Jean Marsh), Polly (Anneke Wills), Jamie McCrimmon (Frazer Hines), Victoria Waterfield (Deborah Watling), Zoe Heriot (Wendy Padbury), Jo Grant (Katy Manning), Brigadier Lethbridge-Stewart (Nicholas Courtney), Sergeant Benton (John Levene), Mike Yates (Richard Franklin), Leela (Louise Jameson), K9 (John Leeson), Romana I (Mary Tamm), Romana II (Lalla Ward), Adric (Matthew Waterhouse), Nyssa (Sarah Sutton), Tegan Jovanka (Janet Fielding), Vislor Turlough (Mark Strickson), Peri Brown (Nicola Bryant), Melanie Bush (Bonnie Langford) and Ace (Sophie Aldred). Adventures featuring revival series companions Rose Tyler (Billie Piper) and Donna Noble (Catherine Tate) have also been released.

Several actors who played the Doctor and companions of previous Doctors have appeared in other roles, including Russell, O'Brien, Marsh, Wills, Watling, Padbury, Caroline John, Manning, Elisabeth Sladen, Leeson, Daphne Ashbrook, Tennant and Bernard Cribbins. Sladen also reprised Sarah Jane Smith in a spin-off series simply entitled Sarah Jane Smith. Sladen never appeared as Sarah alongside any incarnation of the Doctor for Big Finish; a series with Tom Baker was planned, but was never recorded due to Sladen's untimely death in April 2011.

Initially Matthew Waterhouse declined to reprise the role of Adric so the character was recast and played by Andrew Sachs as an older version of the character. Waterhouse later returned to the role on an ongoing basis.

Big Finish also started The Companion Chronicles series of plays, featuring a companion or friend of the Doctor and a supporting cast member. Ford, Russell, O'Brien, Purves, Marsh, Wills, Hines, Watling, Padbury, Manning, Jameson, Tamm, Ward, Sutton, Strickson and Aldred have all reprised their roles in this series along with John (Liz).

As well as this, Big Finish started the Doctor Who: The Early Adventures series of full-cast plays, featuring the First Doctor (recast to William Russell and Peter Purves, following William Hartnell's death in 1975) and the Second Doctor (recast to Frazer Hines, following Patrick Troughton's death in 1987), and companions Barbara Wright (recast to Maureen O'Brien and Jemma Powell, following Jacqueline Hill's death in 1993) and Ben Jackson (recast to Elliot Chapman, following Michael Craze's death in 1998), and Russell, Ford, O'Brien, Purves, Marsh, Wills, Hines, Watling and Padbury reprising their roles from the original series. They also started The Third Doctor Adventures series of full-cast plays, featuring Tim Treloar recast as the Third Doctor (following Jon Pertwee's death in 1996), Manning as Jo, and Franklin as Yates.

Big Finish released The Ninth Doctor Chronicles, a series of plays narrated by Nicholas Briggs and featuring Camille Coduri returning as Jackie Tyler and Bruno Langley returning as the Ninth Doctor's companion Adam Mitchell.

New companions created for the audio series include Evelyn Smythe (Maggie Stables), Charley Pollard (India Fisher), Erimem (Caroline Morris), Hex Schofield (Philip Olivier), C'rizz (Conrad Westmaas), Lucie Miller (Sheridan Smith), Thomas Brewster (John Pickard), Abby (Ciara Janson), Tamsin Drew (Niky Wardley), Elizabeth Klein (Tracey Childs), Flip Jackson (Lisa Greenwood), Molly O'Sullivan (Ruth Bradley), Liv Chenka (Nicola Walker), Helen Sinclair (Hattie Morahan) and Constance Clarke (Miranda Raison). Lisa Bowerman has appeared as Bernice Summerfield, a companion from the Virgin New Adventures, in several Doctor Who audio dramas as well as in original productions with her as the central character. Robert Jezek and Jemima Rooper have appeared as Frobisher and Izzy Sinclair, companions from the Doctor Who Magazine comic strip, Travis Oliver and Yasmin Bannerman have portrayed companions Roz Forrester and Chris Cwej from the Virgin New Adventures, and Matt Di Angelo has played Fitz Kreiner, a companion from the BBC Eighth Doctor Adventures.

Charley, C'rizz, Lucie, Tamsin and Molly were all referenced by name in the mini-episode "The Night of the Doctor".

Broadcast

In 2005, six of the audio dramas featuring Paul McGann as the Eighth Doctor were broadcast on the digital radio station BBC 7: Storm Warning, Sword of Orion, The Stones of Venice, Invaders from Mars, Shada (originally created for webcast on the BBC's online service), and The Chimes of Midnight. These plays were rebroadcast on BBC7 beginning in July 2006. The Chimes of Midnight was repeated again as part of "The New Eighth Doctor Adventures" Series 1 & 2 in 2009.

In January 2007, a new series of Eighth Doctor audio adventures was broadcast on BBC7.  These starred McGann alongside Sheridan Smith as the aforementioned new companion Lucie Miller.  There were eight 50-minute episodes in total; the first and last stories were two-parters, and the rest were single episodes.  These adventures have since been released on CD. In 2008, BBC7 broadcast the second series of The New Eighth Doctor Adventures (which Big Finish had already released on CD) bar the final two-part story. All fourteen episodes were then repeated in 2009, and the final two-part story later that year. Big Finish has gone on to produce two further series of these Adventures, and four selected stories from the third series were aired in 2010, with BBC Radio 4 Extra (as Radio 7 became) skipping ahead to the fourth series in early 2013.

In May/June 2011, BBC Radio 4 Extra broadcast the Fifth Doctor stories Cobwebs, The Whispering Forest, and Cradle of the Snake. In May/June 2012, these were followed by the Seventh Doctor stories A Thousand Tiny Wings, Survival of the Fittest, Klein's Story and The Architects of History. For the fiftieth anniversary of the show, BBC Radio 4 Extra repeated several stories and broadcast two new stories; Protect and Survive starring Sylvester McCoy and 1963: Fanfare for the Common Men starring Peter Davison. In May 2015, BBC Radio 4 Extra broadcast the first series of Fourth Doctor Adventures starring Tom Baker and Louise Jameson. In 2016, the station broadcast a run of Sixth Doctor adventures: The Crimes of Thomas Brewster (28 May – 4 June), Industrial Evolution (11–18 June) and The Curse of Davros (25 June – 2 July).

Doctor Adventure ranges

The First Doctor Adventures (2017–present)

Volume 1 (2017)

Volume 2 (2018)

Volume 3 (2019)

Volume 4 (2020)

Volume 5 (2021)

The Outlaws (2022)

The Demon Song (2023)

The Second Doctor Adventures (2022–present)

Series 1: Beyond War Games (2022)

The Third Doctor Adventures (2015–present)

Volume 1 (2015)

Volume 2 (2016)

Volume 3 (2017)

Volume 4 (2018)

Volume 5 (2019)

Volume 6 (2020)

Volume 7 (2021)

Volume 8 (2021)

The Annihilators (2022)

Kaleidoscope (2022)

The Return of Jo Jones (2023)

The Fourth Doctor Adventures (2012–present)

In 2012, Big Finish began a range of ongoing dramas featuring the Fourth Doctor, as portrayed by Tom Baker. Baker had previously declined to feature in Big Finish releases, but after recording The Fourth Doctor Box Set had been encouraged to participate.

Series 1 (2012)

Special (2012)

Series 2 (2013)

Series 3 (2014)

Series 4 (2015)

Series 5 (2016)

Series 6 (2017)

Series 7 (2018)

Series 8 (2019)

Series 9 (2020)

Special (2020)

Series 10 (2021)

Dalek Universe Prologue (2021)

Series 11 (2022)

Series 12

Series 13

The Fifth Doctor Adventures (2003–present)

Specials

Volume 1 (2014)

Wicked Sisters (2020)

The Lost Resort and Other Stories (2021)

Forty (2022)

Conflicts of Interest

In The Night

The Sixth Doctor Adventures (2002–present)

Specials

The Sixth Doctor: The Last Adventure (2015)

The Sixth Doctor and Peri (2020)

The Eleven (2021)

Water Worlds (2022)

Purity Undreamed (2022)

Purity Unleashed

The Seventh Doctor Adventures (2001–present)

Specials

The Seventh Doctor: The New Adventures (2018)

Silver & Ice (2022)

Sullivan and Cross – AWOL (2022)

The Eighth Doctor Adventures (2007–present)

Special (2003)

The Eighth Doctor Adventures Series 1 (2007)
In 2006 Big Finish began a standalone range of audio plays featuring the Eighth Doctor. These stories were set after his travels with Charley Pollard and C'rizz in the main range, which were subsequently ended.

The Eighth Doctor Adventures Series 2 (2008)

The Eighth Doctor Adventures Series 3 (2009)

The Eighth Doctor Adventures Series 4 (2009–2011)

Special (2010)

Dark Eyes Series 1 (2012)
Following on directly from the Eighth Doctor Adventures, Dark Eyes consists of four box sets, each made up of four hour-long episodes, the first released in November 2012 and the last in March 2015.

Dark Eyes Series 2 (2014)

Dark Eyes Series 3 (2014)

Dark Eyes Series 4 (2015)

Doom Coalition Series 1 (2015)

Doom Coalition Series 2 (2016)

Doom Coalition Series 3 (2016)

Doom Coalition Series 4 (2017)

The Eighth Doctor: The Time War Series 1 (2017)
A special run of prequels to Doctor Who: The War Doctor.

The Eighth Doctor: The Time War Series 2 (2018)

The Eighth Doctor: The Time War Series 3 (2019)

The Eighth Doctor: The Time War Series 4 (2020)

The Eighth Doctor: The Time War Series 5 – Cass (2023)

The Eighth Doctor: The Time War Series 6

Ravenous Series 1 (2018)

Ravenous Series 2 (2018)

Ravenous Series 3 (2019)

Ravenous Series 4 (2019)

Stranded Series 1 (2020)
Featuring the first appearance of Tania Bell (Rebecca Root), the first transgender companion in any Doctor Who media.

Stranded Series 2 (2021)

Stranded Series 3 (2021)

Stranded Series 4 (2022)

The Further Adventures of Lucie Miller (2019)
Announced in August 2018, this series is set between the first and second series of audio adventures.

Charlotte Pollard – The Further Adventuress (2022)

What Lies Inside? (2022)

Connections

The Ninth Doctor Adventures (2021–present)

Series 1 (2021–22)

Series 2 (2022–23)

Series 3

The Tenth Doctor Adventures (2016–present)

Volume 1 (2016)

Volume 2 (2017)

Volume 3 (2019)

Special: Out of Time (2020–present)

Special: The Tenth Doctor and River Song (2020)

Special: Dalek Universe (2021)

Special: Tenth Doctor, Classic Companions (2022)

Other ranges

The Monthly Adventures (1999–2021)

Doctor Who: The Monthly Adventures (previously known as the "Main Range") is a series of full-cast audiobook adventures based on the British science fiction television programme Doctor Who, produced by Nicholas Briggs and Big Finish Productions and starring one of the original actors to play The Doctor on television in the classic era of the programme. By 2018 the range featured the Fifth, Sixth and Seventh Doctors, with a pattern of thirteen releases per year, one every month with two in September or December. In May 2020, Big Finish announced that the Monthly Range would conclude with its 275th issue in March 2021, to be replaced with regular releases of each Doctor in their own boxsets throughout the year from January 2022.

Big Finish Productions began producing audio dramas featuring the Fifth, Sixth, and Seventh Doctors, starting with The Sirens of Time in July 1999. This continued through to 2000, and from 2001 to 2007, the main range also included releases featuring the Eighth Doctor with his companions Charley Pollard and C'rizz, but these were ended due to the simultaneously-running Eighth Doctor Adventures, which ran from 2006 to 2011 and featured companion Lucie Miller. From 2008 to late 2011, only one Eighth Doctor release was produced for the main range: The Company of Friends, featuring companions from other media to the audio plays, and the historical figure Mary Shelley. The Eighth Doctor returned to the main range in a trilogy of adventures with Mary Shelley in October 2011.

Special Releases (2001–present)
This table includes all special releases, including those that would otherwise be considered a spin off release.

Unbound (2003–present)

Original series (2003–08)

Doctor of War (2022)

The Companion Chronicles (2007–present)

The character in brackets in the "Featuring" column is who the story is told by.

Series 1 (2007)

Series 2 (2007–2008)

Series 3 (2008–2009)

Series 4 (2009–2010)

Series 5 (2010–2011)

Specials (2011)

Series 6 (2011–2012)

Special (2012)

Series 7 (2012–2013)

Series 8 (2013–2014)

Series 9: The First Doctor Volume 1 (2015)

Series 10: The Second Doctor Volume 1 (2016)

Series 11: The First Doctor Volume 2 (2017)

Series 12: The Second Doctor Volume 2 (2018)

Series 13: The First Doctor Volume 3 (2019)

Series 14: The Second Doctor Volume 3 (2022)

The Stageplays (2008)

Short Trips (2009–present)

The person in brackets in the "Featuring" column is who the story is read by.

Single Short Trips (2009–21)

Paul Spragg Memorial Short Trips (2016–present)

Volume 1 (2010)

Volume 2 (2011)

Volume 3 (2011)

Volume 4 (2011)

Series 5 (2015)

Series 6 (2016)

Series 7 (2017)

Series 8 (2018)

Series 9 (2019)

Series 10 (2020)

Volume 11 (2022)

Volume 12 (2023)

The Lost Stories (2009–present)

Series 1 (2009–2010)

Series 2 (2010–2011)

Fourth Doctor Lost Stories (2012)

Series 3 (2011–2012)

Series 4 (2013)

Series 5 (2019)

Series 6 (2021)

Special (2022)

Series 7

Novel Adaptations (2012–2016)

Destiny of the Doctor (2013)

Produced for AudioGo to celebrate Doctor Who's 50th anniversary, it was the first series produced by Big Finish to feature Doctors from the revived series (2005–present).

Philip Hinchcliffe Presents (2014–present)

The Early Adventures (2014–present)

Series 1 (2014)

Series 2 (2015–2016)

Series 3 (2016)

Series 4 (2017)

Series 5 (2018)

Series 6 (2019)

Series 7 (2021)

The War Doctor (2015–present)

The War Doctor Series 1: Only the Monstrous (2015)

The War Doctor Series 2: Infernal Devices (2016)

The War Doctor Series 3: Agents of Chaos (2016)

The War Doctor Series 4: Casualties of War (2017)

The War Doctor Begins Series 1: Forged in Fire (2021)

The War Doctor Begins Series 2: Warbringer (2021)

The War Doctor Begins Series 3: Battlegrounds (2022)

The War Doctor Begins Series 4: He Who Fights Monsters (2022)

The War Doctor Begins Series 5: Comrade-in-Arms

The War Doctor Begins Series 6: Enemy Mine

Classic Doctors, New Monsters (2016–present)

Volume 1 (2016)

Volume 2 (2017)

Volume 3: The Stuff of Nightmares (2022)

Volume 4: Broken Memories

The Doctor Chronicles (2017–present)

The Ninth Doctor Chronicles: Volume 1 (2017)
Four new stories from the Ninth Doctor's era, performed by Nicholas Briggs. Featuring Bruno Langley as Adam Mitchell and Camille Coduri as Jackie Tyler.

The Tenth Doctor Chronicles: Volume 1 (2018)
Four narrated stories set in the Tenth Doctor era, performed by Jacob Dudman. Featuring Jacqueline King as Syliva Noble, Michelle Ryan as Lady Christina de Souza and Jon Culshaw.

The Eleventh Doctor Chronicles: Volume 1 (2018)
Four narrated stories set in the Eleventh Doctor era, performed by Jacob Dudman. Featuring Danny Horn as Kazran Sardick and Simon Fisher-Becker as Dorium Maldovar

The Twelfth Doctor Chronicles: Volume 1 (2020)
Four narrated stories set in the  Twelfth Doctor era, performed by Jacob Dudman. Featuring Samuel Anderson as Danny Pink and Ingrid Oliver as Osgood

The Eleventh Doctor Chronicles: Volume 2 (2021)
In a change to previous titles in the range, it was announced this set would be the first to consist of four stories as full cast audio dramas as opposed to narrated. Jacob Dudman will perform as The Eleventh Doctor.

The Twelfth Doctor Chronicles: Volume 2: Timejacked! (2021)
As with volume two of The Eleventh Doctor Chronicles, this release sees Dudman playing the Twelfth Doctor in full cast productions with no narrator.

The Eleventh Doctor Chronicles: Volume 3: Geronimo! (2022)

The Eleventh Doctor Chronicles: Volume 4: All of Time and Space (2023)

The Tenth Doctor Chronicles: Volume 2: Defender of the Earth

The Eleventh Doctor Chronicles: Volume 5

The Eleventh Doctor Chronicles: Volume 6 
Volume 6 of The Eleventh Doctor Chronicles will mark the final boxset where Jacob Dudman portrays the Doctor for the range.

The Audio Novels (2021–present)

The Fugitive Doctor Adventures 
On 23 April 2022, Big Finish announced two box sets starring Jo Martin as the Fugitive Doctor. Alongside Call Me Master, it is the first Big Finish Doctor Who production to be based upon the Chris Chibnall era.

Series 1

Series 2

See also
 Big Finish Productions
 Doctor Who spin-offs

Notes

References

External links
 Big Finish Productions — Big Finish's official page for their Doctor Who range
 Doctor Who page on BBC 7 Drama site
 The TARDIS Library — An expanded listing of Big Finish's Doctor Who audios, with cover images & user ratings/reviews.

 
Big Finish Productions
Audio plays by Big Finish
Doctor Who spin-offs
Doctor Who audio plays by Big Finish